The Substitute 3: Winner Takes All is a 1999 action thriller film directed by Robert Radler and starring Treat Williams as a mercenary who goes undercover as a teacher in order to expose a college football team's steroid-abuse scandal. It is the second sequel to The Substitute (1996). The film was later released on DVD and in 2000 it was bundled with the first film.

Plot
Students at a local college have become unusually antagonistic, and when a teacher is attacked by a gang of steroid-pumped students, Karl Thomasson—having earned a teacher's degree to facilitate his actions in the previous film—returns to the classroom to uncover the truth.

What he finds is shocking: the college's football coach is involved in a steroid-doping scandal, and his 'juiced' students were responsible for the attack on the teacher.  Thomasson recruits his old team, planting surveillance equipment in a jukebox inside a local sports-bar that hosts a number of the coach's football players.

It turns out that the coach was doping his players, and rigging football games, to pay off his backers—a local crime syndicate.  When the audio equipment draws the attention of the syndicate's thugs, one of Karl's team is killed in the van, and Karl's calm and collected mask begins to slip.

When one of Thomasson's students dies from a steroid overdose, Thomasson finally loses his jovial nature, confronting the coach and telling him that he knows how the student died, that he knows the coach is responsible, and that he has videotape to prove his allegations.

In one last showdown, Karl defeats the syndicate and reveals the doping scandal—as he leaves, and the credits roll, a radio news report reveals that the football coach committed suicide in disgrace.

Cast
 Treat Williams as Karl Thomasson
 Rebecca Staab as Professor Nicole Stewart
 Claudia Christian as Andrea 'Andy'
 James R. Black as Rahmel
 Frank Gerrish as Ed Lincoln
 David H. Stevens as Tony Lo Russo
 Richard Portnow as Vincent 'The Brick' Lo Russo
 George Fisher as Sylvio
 Maxx Payne as 'Muscle'
 Dane Stevens as Jerry Sundheim
 Richard Humphreys as Kirby
 David Jenson as Mason 'Macy' Stewart
 Spencer Ashby as Professor Wayne McMurdo
 Barbara Jane Reams as Albanian Girl 
 Brian Simpsons as Soldier #1
 Jeff Jenson as Soldier #2
 Erin Chambers as Terri
 Scott Wilkinson as Coach Bill Braden
 Michael Shane Davis as Josh Silver
 Ed Cameron as Bo Robinson
 Christian Jenson as Thad
 Danny Hansen as Jeremy Phillips
 Robert Harvey as Counterman

External links

1999 action thriller films
1990s crime action films
1999 films
American action thriller films
American crime action films
American crime thriller films
American sequel films
Films about educators
Films about school violence
Direct-to-video sequel films
The Substitute films
Films directed by Robert Radler
1990s English-language films
1990s American films